Angels is a 2014 Indian Malayalam-language social thriller film inspired by the 2012 South Korean film Confession of Murder directed by debutant Jean Markose. The film stars an ensemble cast consisting of Indrajith Sukumaran, Asha Sarath, Joy Mathew, Baiju, Prem Prakash, Vijayakumar,  and Lakshmi Priyaa Chandramouli. The screenplay was written by Jean Markose and Toni Tomy, with dialogues co-written by Shabu Kilithatil.

Plot
S. P. Hameem Hyder is a brilliant police officer in the Special Armed Police Department. He does his work efficiently but is an egoist to some extent. Due to external pressures, he is forced to step aside from a case he has been dealing with. He is offended by this and wants to take revenge on those behind forcing his recusal. His earlier crime investigation becomes the focus of the reality crime show Views 24x7, and it is at this juncture that priest Varghese Punyaalan and Journalist Haritha Menon enter his life. Both of them want to know about Hyder and his earlier investigations, but their interests are unrelated and have different motivations. In their attempts to attain their goal, each becomes aware of the other, and the resulting conflict builds the rest of the storyline.

Cast

 Indrajith Sukumaran as S. P. Hameem Hyder
 Asha Sarath as TV anchor Haritha Menon
 Joy Mathew as Father Varghese Punyaalan
 Baiju as S.P. Ashok Kumar
 Prem Prakash as Channel Production Head 
 Vijayakumar as Sub Inspector Poly
 Lakshmi Priyaa Chandramouli as Zaina
 Dinesh Panicker as D.I.G Rajan Punnose
 Aneesh G Menon as Rishi
 Parvathi Menon as Princess Malavika
 Anjali Aneesh as Nandita
 Thara Kalyan as Dr. Sandra Mary
 Indrans as attender
 Baby Annie as Jency Jacob
 Parvathy R. Krishna
 Lakshmi Sanal
 Majid as Bishop
 Jobi Varghese (cameo appearance)

Production
Filming took place at Chitranjali Studios in Thiruvananthapuram. The film is Produced by Linu Issac, Hisham Basheer, Saju Azad, Maya Kartha under the banner of Cloud 4 Cinemas. Music is composed by Jakes Bejoy, with Sujith Sarang as cinematographer and Sreejith Sarang as editor. Principal filming completed on 5 June 2014.  During filming, there was a shoot day when director Jean Markose was incapacitated due to a high fever, and Indrajith stepped in to temporarily direct a hospital scene featuring Tara Kalyan. Film producer Linu Issac stated "Indran (Indrajith) rocked it."

Jean Markose is a radio jockey from Dubai and has directed several short films in Dubai. He narrated the script to Indrajith, his wife's cousin, who "immediately signed the deal with a handshake" as he liked the "powerful social message" it had.  According to director Markose, the film is a "social thriller that revolves around ‘Views 24x7,’ a popular crime and investigative show".  Indrajith's role is that of a police officer who was tagged as a "loser" and hence different from other traditional cop roles. Asha Sarath was signed to play a journalist named Haritha, with the actress stating that Haritha was "as unscrupulous as Geetha", her character in Drishyam.

References

External links
 

2010s Malayalam-language films
2014 directorial debut films
Indian thriller films
Indian remakes of South Korean films
Films shot in Thiruvananthapuram
Films scored by Jakes Bejoy